Claremont High School is a co-educational public high school in the suburb of Claremont, Cape Town, South Africa, established in 2011 making it the newest addition to the list of schools in the area. It awards the National Senior Certificate. It is locally known for the excellent final year result it manages to produce.

History

The city's department of education had decided to embark on a project and create a school that would primarily focus on maths and science but also be easily accessible to the diverse variety of students in Cape Town. In order to accelerate its development Westerford High School, a well-known and successful high school in close proximity, was given the task of overseeing the development of Claremont High. Westerford's principal at the time, Rob le Roux, became the temporary principal of Claremont High during its opening year. Many of Westerford High School's teaching staff were a part of Claremont High's first teaching staff. Claremont High's growth meant that there was less influence from Westerford however there is still a good relationship between the two schools and it is still considered one of Claremont High's founding pillars.

References 

High schools in South Africa